Ballantine is a locality located within Lac Ste. Anne County in the Canadian province of Alberta.

History 
Ballantine was originally called Wild Horse Valley, with the post office called "Wildhorse". In 1903–1904, the Grand Trunk Pacific Railway surveyed and cut both a railway route and wagon trails the Lac Ste. Anne area. One of the trails went from Onion Prairie (later Rich Valley) to Wild Horse Valley. Mail was delivered over this route. The name "Wildhorse" was frequently confused with "Whitehorse" in the Yukon, so in 1914, the post office was renamed Ballantine.

The Ballantine area was covered with large tracts of spruce forest, the raw material for a significant logging and lumber operations, which opened up the land for farming.  By 1919 many homesteaders had settled in the area. A community hall had been constructed and was being used for social events, including those sponsored by the United Farmers of Alberta (UFA).

References 

Localities in Lac Ste. Anne County